William Pattison Telford may refer to:

 William Pattison Telford Sr. (1836–1922), Canadian Member of Parliament, 1904–1908
 William Pattison Telford Jr. (1867–1955), Canadian Member of Parliament, 1926–1930 and 1935–1944